Callasopia is a genus of snout moths. It was described by Heinrich Benno Möschler in 1890, and contains the species Callasopia rosealis. It is found in Puerto Rico.

References

Chrysauginae
Monotypic moth genera
Moths of the Caribbean
Pyralidae genera
Taxa named by Heinrich Benno Möschler